The Königs Wusterhausen transmitter was a large transmission facility for longwave, mediumwave and shortwave radio, located near Königs Wusterhausen southeast of Berlin, Germany. Initially built by the telegraph battalion of the German Army, operation began during World War I in 1916. On 22 December 1920, the transmission of a Christmas concert marked the birth of public broadcasting in Germany.

History
 
The German armed forces had conducted experiments in radio technology on the Windmühlenberg hill northwest of Königs Wusterhausen since 1911, with mobile stations mounted on horse carriages and antennas held up by captive balloons. Extended signal corps facilities were erected at the site from 1913 onwards, including a large antenna system and several functional buildings. Later called Senderhaus 1, the military broadcasting station was put into operation in 1916.

After the war, the German Reichspost took over the barracks with effect from September 1919 and used the facilities for the transmission of weather reports, financial news, and telegrams. Radio broadcasting was initiated by post official Hans Bredow and his staff when they used an arc converter supplied by C. Lorenz AG for the first transmission of speech and music in the longwave range on 22 December 1920, making Königs Wusterhausen the "cradle of German broadcasting". After private radio reception was authorised by law in 1923, transmissions quickly developed throughout the Weimar Republic. The facilities soon had to be enlarged and a second station building (Sendehaus 2) was inaugurated in 1923

It was soon followed by a longwave transmitter in nearby Zeesen (Deutschlandsender II) and the first public shortwave transmitter for international broadcasting (Weltrundfunksender), built by the Telefunken company and inaugurated in August 1929. After the Nazi seizure of power in 1933, these facilities were extensively used for propaganda purposes.

With the end of World War II, Königs Wusterhausen was part of the Soviet occupation zone and several masts were taken down by order of the military government, though the station remained in use for broadcasting in East Germany. The Central Tower collapsed during the Cyclone Quimburga on 15 November 1972. The remaining transmitters for mediumwave, shortwave and longwave were shut down between 1992 and 1999 and the whole area was transformed into a museum, which is marked by the 210-metre-high mast.

For mobile phone services and low power FM broadcasting, a 67-metre-high free-standing tower of concrete was built in 1994.

See also 
 List of transmission sites
 List of tallest structures

References

External links 

 
 skyscraperpage.com

History of telecommunications in Germany
Radio masts and towers in Germany
1916 establishments in Germany
Towers completed in 1916
Buildings and structures in Dahme-Spreewald